The Flyboys (released Internationally as Sky Kids) is a 2008 American aviation adventure film starring Reiley McClendon, Jesse James, Stephen Baldwin and Tom Sizemore. The Flyboys revolve around a "coming-of-age" story of two boys from a small town who find their courage tested when they accidentally stow away aboard an aircraft owned by the mob. This was the final film for actor Harrison Young, who died three years before the film was released.

Plot
In a small Arizona town, the new kid, Kyle, finds himself saving one of his classmates, Jason, from a group of bullies and they quickly become friends. 
Jason takes Kyle to the local airport where his uncle Ed works, and they all go on a flight. Thrilled about the adventure, they plan to meet again the next morning at the airport. On their own they check out some planes, first sitting inside a small light aircraft before Jason leads them to a mysterious hangar with a larger plane. While trying out the controls of the silver colored twin-engine airliner, the hangar doors unexpectedly open and the boys immediately hide to avoid getting in trouble. They hope that whoever it is will simply leave shortly so they hide in the rear baggage compartment but to their dismay the plane gets started and heads for takeoff. Jason sneaks a peak to see who is on board and is startled to see that one of the men has a gun. At a stopover at an unknown airport, a small bag gets placed into the boys' compartment. The plane takes off again and after a while the boys discover the bag contains a bomb. They burst into the cabin to report their discovery but are shocked to see that the plane is empty. Kyle throws the bomb out of the door while Jason gets in the cockpit to maneuver the plane away from a mountainside. Together they then manage to safely land the aircraft. The two are regarded in the news as heroes, but their troubles have now caught up to them. Jason and Kyle soon realize that they are embroiled in a criminal effort to steal millions of dollars from the mob. In the process of staying one step ahead of gangsters, they find their courage to come out on top.

Cast

 Reiley McClendon as Kyle Barrett
 Jesse James as Jason McIntyre
 Stephen Baldwin as Silvio Esposito
 Tom Sizemore as Angelo Esposito
 J. Todd Adams as Lenny Drake
 Dallen Gettling as Ed Thomas
 Jennifer Slimko as Samantha Barrett
 Robert Costanzo as Carmine
 Vince Cecere as Manny
 Frank D'Amico as Sal
 Harrison Young as Grandpa Thomas
 Blaire Baron as Susan Thomas
 Tommy Hinkley as John McIntyre
 Joanne Baron as Ms. Poulson
 Dylan Kasch as Rick
 Jesse Plemons as Bully #1
 Travis Whitney as Bully #2

Production
Producer, director and screenwriter Rocco DeVilliers worked with a $2.4 million budget, meagre for a major production. Including pre-production, work on the film took over seven years. Once production was complete, the film was shopped around to major studios and distributors but was not successful in making any headway. Ultimately, despite 21 wins at numerous film festivals, The Flyboys was relegated to a DVD release, re-titled as Sky Kids. Promotional efforts then centered on the new title. The film was broadcast on Sky Movies UK on August 15, 2009. It was released on DVD in the UK titled Sky Kids on May 25, 2009.

The Flyboys was filmed in parts of Southwestern Utah, mainly in Hurricane, Utah, St. George, Utah, Washington, Utah and Zion National Park. Principal photography took place at Mesquite Airport, in Clark County, Nevada, United States. The aircraft used in the film included: a Bullock Bu-180 (N145BB), Beech 18S (CZ -265, N476PA), Beech A36 Bonanza, Eurocopter AS350 Écureuil  (N410JC), and Piper PA-34-220T Seneca III (N83878).

Reception
In 2008, Devilliers embarked on an odyssey of film festivals all over the United States, with The Flyboys picking up 21 individual awards. A total of 14 awards were for best feature film while Steven Baldwin was also nominated for best supporting actor.

See also
 List of American films of 2008

References

Notes

Citations

Bibliography

 Beck, Simon D. The Aircraft-Spotter's Film and Television Companion. Jefferson, North Carolina: McFarland and Company, 2016. .

External links
  (website down)
 
 
 

2008 films
2000s adventure films
2008 independent films
American aviation films
American children's adventure films
American independent films
Films about children
Mafia films
Warner Bros. films
2000s English-language films
2000s American films